The Humble Civic Center Arena is a 7,500-seat multi-purpose arena in Humble, Texas, USA. It hosts local sporting events and concerts.

External links
 Official website

Sports venues in Texas
Indoor arenas in Texas